Jusic, Jusić, or Jušić is a Serbo-Croatian surname. Notable people with the surname include:

 Adela Jušić (born 1982), contemporary visual artist from Bosnia and Herzegovina
 Đelo Jusić (born 1939), Croatian-Bosniak composer, arranger, conductor and guitarist
 Hana Jušić (born 1983), Croatian film director and screenwriter
 Ibrica Jusić (born 1944), Croatian-Bosniak chanson, folk, pop and sevdalinka singer-songwriter, musician
 Omer Jusić (1942–2008), football player from Bosnia and Herzegovina
 Zyad Jusić (born 1980), Yugoslav-born Dutch professional footballer